Eldor is a masculine given name and a surname that may refer to the following notable people:
Eldor Shomurodov (born 1995), Uzbek football forward
Eldor Urazbayev (1940–2012), Russian film director, screenwriter and producer 
Hussein Eldor (born 1994), Lebanese football player